Daniel P. Meyer (born 1965) is an attorney admitted in the District of Columbia and is currently the Managing Partner of the Washington D.C. Office of Tully Rinckey, PLLC, an international law firm headquartered at Albany, New York, and co-founded by Mathew Tully and Greg Rinckey.

Early life

Meyer took his Bachelor of Arts at Cornell University in 1987 and his Juris Doctor at Indiana University Maurer School of Law in 1995. He is a member of the bar, District of Columbia, a veteran of the first Gulf War and a National Security Studies Fellow – Maxwell School, Syracuse University.  Mr. Meyer has also completed the U.S. Judge Advocate General's invitation-only Intelligence Law course at Charlottesville, Virginia in 2010, focusing on the law governing intelligence and counterintelligence activities by the United States.

Meyer is a former naval officer. A veteran of the Persian Gulf War, he is also a survivor of the 1989 explosion on board battleship , in which a technical malfunction destroyed Turret Two. During the Iowa investigation, then Lieutenant (j.g.) Meyer became a whistleblower when he disclosed alleged misdirection of the investigation to the Senate Armed Services Committee.  Regarding his whistleblowing, Dan Meyer stated in 2011, "I can empathize  with the pressure that's put on you.  But the Navy did OK by me." Meyer's fleet service was the subject of a 2001 TV film, A Glimpse of Hell, starring Robert Sean Leonard (as Meyer) and James Caan (as Captain Fred Moosally). A book of the same title was authored by veteran 60 Minutes journalist Charles S. Thompson (W.W. Norton & Co. 1999).

In 1993 and 1994, Meyer served as regulatory clerk to Commissioner Andrew C. Barrett of the Federal Communications Commission. He also served as a graduate intern to the Office of Communications Research in the Executive Office of the President during the first Clinton Administration. While at the White House, he assisted the President's 'War Rooms' for the Omnibus Budget Reconciliation Act of 1993 and the North American Free Trade Agreement of 1994. The Communications Research team was under the direction of Ann Walker Marchant, and reported to Mark Gearan (later David Gergen) and supported the activities of George Stephanopoulos, Dee Dee Myers, and Gene Sperling.

In the United States Navy, Meyer served as Communications & Signals Officer for the Flagship Middle East Force during Operations Desert Shield and Desert Storm. He conned the  during that ship's mine sweeping operations to liberate Mina Al Shuaiba, and also during the repelling of Islamic Guard pirates off Nakhiloo Island in 1991. Prior to that assignment, he was the Turret One Officer on board battleship Iowa from 1987 through 1990. He and his gunners broke the world's record in naval offshore gunnery at Vieques Island on January 28, 1989.

During his naval service, Meyer was awarded honors, including Surface Warrior Pin, Iowa (1989); Navy and Marine Corps Achievement Medal, Seventh Fleet (1991; for meritorious service under Commander U.S. Naval Central Command during the Persian Gulf War); Navy Meritorious Unit Commendation, Commander, Naval Surface Forces, Atlantic (1990); for meritorious service in the aftermath of the explosion on board Iowa. While Officer of the Deck of LaSalle, he qualified for the Combat Action Ribbon during minesweeping operations off Kuwait. Other naval operations in which Meyer participated included the Ernest Will Operations escorting U.S.-flagged oil tankers through the Straits of Hormuz (1987–1988) and the planned strike at Nahr al-Kalb in 1989. He served under Captains Larry Seaquist and Fred Moosally on board Iowa. His commanding officer during Desert Shield and the beginning of Desert Storm was John B. Nathman.  Dating from his days on the IOWA tasked to Commander, Cruiser-Destroyer Group Eight, Meyer counted Jeremy Michael Boorda among his mentors through the mid-1990s.

Private practice (1997 to 2004)
Prior to serving as director, CRI, Meyer practiced law with private firms and non-profit corporations in the District of Columbia, specializing in communications and whistleblower law. He is the former general counsel of Public Employees for Environmental Responsibility (PEER), where he represented Teresa Chambers and worked the gubernatorial issues surrounding the case of Cindy Ossias. Significant litigation included Moosally v. W.W. Norton & Co., 594 S.E.2d 878 (S.C. Ct. App. 2004)(limiting reach of South Carolina courts in defamation cases); R.I. Dep't of Envtl. Mgmt. v. United States, 304 F.3d 31 (1st Cir. 2003)(securing right of federal government to intervene against the States in Department of Labor adjudicatory proceedings); William T. Knox v. United States Department of Labor, 434 F.3d 721 (4th Cir. 2006) (alleging that the United States Department of the Interior ("DOI") violated the whistleblower provision of the Clean Air Act ("CAA"), 42 U.S.C.§ 7622); and appellate litigation in behalf of the shipping services sector of the economy following the consolidation of railroad ownership in the 1990s. Meyer's labor advocacy included participation in the rulemaking regarding the privatization of essential government activities. A critic of privatization, he argued that privatization reaches a limit after which cost savings is limited and enforcement reduced. Meyer's legal writings have appeared in the Federal Communications Law Journal and the Western New England Law Journal. He is also a non-managerial equity partner of The Crescent Group-based out of New Haven, Connecticut.

Director, Whistleblowing & Transparency (2010 to 2013) and Director, Civilian Reprisal Investigations (2004 to 2010)
Meyer is the former director for whistleblowing and transparency (DW&T) to the Inspector General of the Defense Department. As Director DW&T, Meyer's role was to promulgate a whistleblower protection program and provide leadership for investigations implementing and ensuring accountability in the protection of employees, military and civilian, as well as contractors who disclose violations of law, rule and/or regulation. The DW&T also coordinated office policy on Qui Tam and False Claims Act litigation.  As DW&T, Meyer also handled sensitive disclosures to Congressional staff, most notably whistleblowing regarding LOGCAP, Retired Military Analysts, the Afghan National Hospital, and the movie Zero Dark Thirty. From January 2004 to September 2010, Meyer was a federal supervisory investigator specializing in the protection of sources providing information regarding wrongdoing, also known as "whistleblowers." Formerly as the Director, Civilian Reprisal Investigations (DCRI), Meyer led a directorate composed of two investigative teams: the National Security Reprisal Team (NSRT) and the Procurement Fraud Reprisal Team (PFRT).  In the spring of 2010, he was announced as a finalist for the Samuel J. Heyman Service to America Medal, National Security and International Affairs category., an award he shared with all his investigators, including Andrew P. Bakaj.

Meyer has been a consistent critic of pro-management judicial and administrative interpretations of the Whistleblower Protection Act of 1989, noting their corrosive effect on the intent of the United States Congress in passing the Act.  In his role as Director of DW&T and CRI, Meyer has been described as " . . . pretty fearless.  He has the knowledge and technical acumen to determine what is right.". In 2001, Meyer cautioned whistleblowers that despite the fact that the Whistleblower Protection Act of 1989 ". . . says that federal workers should be protected, not punished . . . whistleblowing remains an often risky and difficult path . . . ."  Dan Meyer is credited within overcoming some senior leadership reticence to protecting whistleblowers within the intelligence and counterintelligence communities.  When addressing whistleblower issues, Meyer focuses on the fact that whistleblowing plays "an important role in improving government performance and accountability."  He considers whistleblowing to be " . . . all about transparency.  We shouldn't run from letting the people know what we federal employees are doing.  In fact, if we had more transparency, we would have fewer problems.  More government transparency allows more senior executive and congressional oversight; and oversight allows for the correction of government failures." When describing the Inspector General's reprisal investigations, Meyer stated, "We just call them as they are.  I have no concerns at all for protecting the wrongdoer.  At the end of the day, the business of government is the people's business, not the wrongdoer's business."

Return to private practice
Following his tour as an intelligence officer in 2018, Meyer returned to the private practice of law for the first time since 2004. Meyer advises security clearance applicants and holders on foreign influence and preference. On the eve of the President threatening reprisal against a whistleblower in 2019, Meyer and co-author Martin "Mick" Andersen proposed reforming executive branch whistleblowing.

When Virginia Governor Ralph Northam was exposed in blackface, Meyer used the media attention to focus security clearances on their own potential liabilities for personal conduct, "It all depends on whether the behavior can turn you into an asset for enemies of the State. Federal employees privileged with a security clearance are held to a standard of behavior established by the President through the Director of National Intelligence. If you have engaged in personal conduct which could be used to leverage you into leaking classified information, then you need to self-report to your security officer to remove, for instance, the blackmail liability of wearing blackface.” During the 2019 Federal furlough, Meyer flagged the financial considerations issue saturating the President's decision to shut down the Government: “High credit card balances can trigger a security review, even if you are paid up. So as the shutdown moves into a second or third pay period, these employees will start tripping the continuous monitoring algorithms scanning employee credit reports. By June, we could see an uptick in reviews as these employees defend their financial considerations.”

At the beginning 2019, the Trump Administration was not as set against whistleblowers as it would be by the close of the year. Initial thoughts of repealing the Presidential directive providing for Intelligence Community whistleblower protection yielded to sounder views, notably those of Don McGahn, who agreed with Meyer's view that a safe conduit for disclosures to the Congress would help bleed off the pressure to leak. Meyer's initial reaction in September 2019 was to note that the DNI chose not to invoke Section 8H of the Inspector General Act which allows the agency head to bar an inspector general's inquiry so long as the Congress is informed. His subsequent general response to the Impeachment inquiry against Donald Trump was to advocate for neither side of the political process, but rather to adopt a Legal process (jurisprudence) approach to ongoing analysis of events. The beginning and the end of the Trump Impeachment inquiry were both twenty-four months after the security investigation and removal of Meyer as the head of Intelligence Community whistleblowing.
 
Meyer provided a summary of the tools available to potential Intelligence Community whistleblowers at the National Whistleblower Celebration Day luncheon on Capitol Hill in 2017. His views were also sought and published regarding the Trump Administration's (and its allies) assertions that the Ukraine whistleblower's motivations were germane to the proceedings. When the President's detractors overstated the protections available for the Ukraine whistleblower, Meyer pointed out that Congress itself had left those protections incomplete. The legal process approach became most important in the Impeachment inquiry as Congressman Jim Jordan demanded to know the identity of the whistleblower. Dan's response was it is best not to reveal the name of the source, but also to advise that Congress members in general are not barred in unmasking whistleblowers. Meyer's appearance on Wisconsin Public Radio, in particular, was delivered as a general tutorial on whistleblowing and regarding the importance of the Congress in the articulation of American sovereignty. With CNN's Brianna Keilar, Dan explained the role the President was assign to play in protecting the whistleblower and the impact whistleblowing has on the source. Meyer noted that the President was not the whistleblower but rather the official charged with protecting the whistleblower. Dan continued by noting that in the case of White House failure, the head of agency is required to stand in to ensure protection. He focuses on what Meyer calls "Whistleblowing operations" as distinguished from the  "vernacular Whistleblowing" rooted in the 1970s activism leading to the Congressional civil service and whistleblowing reforms of 1978 and 1982.

Meyer's public outreach supports a balanced approach to the relationship between the Congress and the President, at issue, for instance, in the recent Supreme Court decision in Lucia v. Security Exchange Commission (2018) and its progeny. Meyer has noted the Court is now refereeing a heated conflict between the Congress and the President, one in which the Federal agencies are the contested turf. This analytic line was also evident in comments to the press following the issuance of the Mueller report, "the tension between Congress and the White House doesn't really involve the law. Instead, it's a political and constitutional battle over when one co-equal branch of government can force another to follow orders." His comments are also critical of Federal agency attorneys seeking to exploit division between the branches to the detriment of Federal employees, as well as those instances where agency attorneys use other areas of law to distort or thwart Congressional acts to promote whistleblowing. In support of the Executive, this concern includes comments favorable to the President's prerogative in selecting his own appointees free from commitments made by previous executives. As President Donald Trump conducted a campaign against federal Inspectors General in the wake of his first impeachment, Meyer noted that the system of Congressionally-created inspectors general were losing their effectiveness. As the Inspector General crisis deepened, Dan was quick to remind official Washington this was a partial continuation of the Trump Administration's 2017 agenda to remove all inspectors general.

Meyer has become a source for reporting on the work conditions of these Federal servants as they execute for the President a mission prescribed by the Congress. During the COVID epidemic, this included commenting on the growing limitations required of public servants during the COVID pandemic, as well as noting the effect of sunshine laws on the rights of LGBTQ+ employees. Also of particular interest is the vulnerability of Federal employees when their supervisors violate the law and the employee is under a positive obligation to report the violation. Meyer also supports proactive media efforts to assist public employees in understanding the limitations that may be applied to them retroactively during events such as the 2018–2019 United States federal government shutdown, a shutdown which produced a good natured tete à tete with Citizens for Responsibility and Ethics in Washington (CREW) attorney and chief ethics officer Virginia Canter over Crowdfunding in support of furloughed Federal employees.

Meyer was an advocate of lawsuits by Federal employees against the U.S. Government during the same furlough, a position revealed by Meyer's explanation of the Martin case which "established the principle that it's a violation of the FLSA to have employees basically work for free; that's what's going on here. AFGE has an incremental strategy; each time there is a furlough, they bring another case to expand the law further and further, so at some point we may get to a position legally where the cost of the shutdowns are known ahead of time because AFGE has won all of those cases. So the executive branch will understand exactly the cost going into a shutdown. If federal law was being enforced the way it was passed by the Congress, there would be a huge disincentive for the executive branch to engage in a shutdown because it would be just too expensive."

Meyer frequently offers his assessment on developments regarding the effectiveness of Federal oversight as well as national security issues including counterintelligence and the collection, analysis, and dissemination of intelligence. Of particular interest has been the structure of Defense contracts and the potential counterintelligence vulnerabilities poised by the adoption of emerging technologies. Inspectors general concerns also includes agency performance regarding health and welfare of employees, including the central role of the Director of National Intelligence and the Director, Central Intelligence Agency, in the protection of whistleblowers and the institution failure of the Intelligence Community Inspectors General forum to parallel the Council of Inspectors General on Integrity and Efficiency's (CIGIE) calling out of the Justice Department for the Administration's failure to lawfully handle protected disclosures.

Meyer's support for inspector general reform extended, in mid-2019, to unsuccessful efforts to reconfigure the remains of the old IC Whistleblowing program closed down in 2017 through the Intelligence Authorization Act. Those proposed reforms included a codified appeals process for whistleblowers who faced retaliation. The reform recommended that the Intelligence Community create an administrative entity similar to the Merit Systems Protection Board. Support for reform included the new Congressional whistleblower Ombuds position created by Speaker of the House Nancy Pelosi

Termination from the Intelligence Community
The Director of National Intelligence permitted Meyer contact with the media during the two hearings held in three parts prior to Meyer's his separation.  That media access combined with subsequent disclosures by other intelligence officers have provided the facts known by the public regarding what became the take down of the program informally known as IC Whistleblowing from 2013 to 2018. As PenAmerica reported, "[i]n 2013 the directorate was created to help promote whistleblowing as an internal function. Former whistleblower Dan Meyer was appointed as ICW&SP's executive director, a selection that was praised by civil society groups. But in November 2017, Meyer was placed on administrative leave and escorted from his office. In March, Meyer was fired for undisclosed reasons in a process that was—in the words of two U.S. senators—'marked by procedural irregularities and serious conflicts of interest.'"

Even though Meyer requested the required investigation into reprisal against him for three Congressional disclosures, Inspector General Michael Atkinson (Inspector General) did not open an investigation.

Meyer appeared at the National Whistleblower Day celebration immediately following his removal. Though his case was deemed to be important in the issues that it raised, no investigation followed. Meyer thanked Senators Chuck Grassley and Rand Paul, Mark Warner and Ron Wyden, and then maintained the same position he did as an intelligence officer: Federal employees are required to blow the whistle, so blowing the whistle should be so common it is reported positively on annual performance ratings. Meyer closed his talk with an anecdote from the first John Adams Administration and used it to warn of events to come over the next two years, 2018 to 2020.

IC Whistleblowing was eventually replaced by a new entity, the Center for Protected Disclosures (CPD).

At the beginning of Meyer's removal, Senator Grassley began a long pursuit of documents pertaining to CIA electronic monitoring of Congressional staff working whistleblower cases and combined that with an interest in obtaining disclosure of information pertaining to Dan Meyer's termination Dan Meyer. When Grassley release evidence in November 2018 that Meyer had been monitored while he was communicating with Congressional staff on whistleblowing matters, Meyer released a statement stating, "The Intelligence Community whistleblowing program, and its branch of protection for all federal security clearance holders, is based on a presidential order.  When the president says ‘jump three feet,’ all federal officials are required to jump three feet. In the case of reviewing supervisors’ and managers’ malfeasance for whistleblower reprisal, this means every qualifying complainant gets a local agency review. If a cadre within the Intelligence Community or any of the 72 or so federal offices with security clearances is slow rolling or obstructing compliance with a presidential directive, those officials need to answer for their insubordination. Such officials may be insider threats working against Presidential Policy Directive 19; they may also be unworthy to stay within the circle of trust by retaining a security clearance."

Congressional testimony
In testimony before the United States Congress in 2003, Meyer advanced a theory stating that there is a false dichotomy between Defense readiness and Environmental compliance. National security and environmental security are two components of the common defense. Central to the theory is the concept that national security achieved at the expense of the environment undermines the purpose for which a common defense is maintained. In his 2003 testimony before House Resources, Meyer distanced himself Raymond F. Dubois, Deputy Undersecretary of Defense for Installations, and Environment, Department of Defense. Meyer advised the committee that environmental laws were to be read together, each successive act of Congress forming an evolving set of mandates on federal agencies, all of which were to be organized as a whole under an Integrated Natural Resources Management Plan. Meyer also used the hearing as an opportunity to warn the Congress about the impact of the U.S. Court of Appeals for the Federal Circuit's decision in the Huffman case (2000), fundamentally changing the protections afforded to federal whistleblowers, and the dangers of further delegations of statutory responsibilities to the States unless a concurrent delegation of the whistleblower protection provisions was matched by a waiver of sovereign immunity. While at PEER, Meyer was moving this theory into a deconfliction of environmental and mercantile policies as well. This is evident in his pleading regarding Installing and Maintaining Commercial Submarine Cables in National Marine Sanctuaries, 65 Fed. Reg. 51264-51270 (Dkt. No. 0005261-0157-01)(Aug. 23, 2000). Reference to the PEER environmental security work during Meyer's tenure can be found in Rita Floyd's Security and the Environment: Securitisation Theory and U.S. Environmental Security Policy (2010).

During the winter of 2006, Meyer appeared in Congressional testimony with Mr. Thomas F. Gimble, Acting Inspector General of the U.S. Department of Defense, and Ms. Jane Deese, Director of Military Reprisal Investigations before the U.S. House of Representatives, Committee on Government Reform, Subcommittee on National Security, Emerging Threats, and International Relations. The hearing was called by Congressman Chris Shays (R-CT).  In the testimony, the Office of the Inspector General stated that it had the authority to investigate adverse security clearance and access decisions as part of its broad responsibility for investigating allegations that individuals suffered reprisal for making disclosures of fraud, waste and abuse to certain authorities. Meyer's February 2006 testimony discussed the importance of whistleblower-initiated complaints driving the investigative process so that the offices of inspectors general are not used to target whistleblowers. The issue arose in an exchange with Ohio Congressman Dennis Kucinich (D-Ohio) and related to the experience of Sgt. Samuel Provance. In his Congressional testimony, Meyer's positions have typically supported the independence of discrete constitutional actions. This concern for the independence of government decision-making is also present in his first appearance in a court of law, making oral argument in United States v. Graf, 35 M.J. 450, 1992 CMA LEXIS 1032 (Sept. 30, 1992).

Community Involvement
Meyer served as  mayor of the Town of Burkittsville, Maryland  in 2001–2004. He also served as the chairman of that municipality's Planning & Zoning Commission. Meyer ran unopposed.  In the year prior to the election, he was known for his objection to Burkittsville's treatment by the makers of The Blair Witch Project, a mock documentary horror film that became a hit in 1999.  Reflecting on Hollywood's performance in both A Glimpse of Hell and The Blair Witch Project, Meyer saw an inverse relationship between the movies.  'With the 'Blair Witch' thing, you were looking at a movie that had a fictitious account of the town.  In the IOWA story, it was the exact opposite. The media product is more accurate to the truth than any official finding.'

During this service from 1996 to 2002, he aided the town in its response to the Blair Witch Project and also assisted local residents in developing preservation strategies during the buildout of communications technologies after the Telecommunications Act of 1996.  Meyer is currently an usher and a lector, Saint John's Parish Church in Hagerstown, Maryland and is exceedingly active in alumni affairs for Cornell University.

Personal and family
Meyer was born at the U.S. Naval Hospital, New London, Connecticut. During his youth, the family was assigned to naval stations in the tidewater of Virginia, northern Virginia, Northwood, England and Ithaca, New York, during his childhood and adolescence. He is a 1983 Regent's graduate of Ithaca High School, and studied at Cornell University under Dan Baugh, George McTurnan Kahin, Peter Katzenstein, Isaac Kramnick, Walter LaFeber (himself a student of William Appleman Williams), Theodore J. Lowi, Mary Beth Norton and Norman Uphoff.

Meyer is the spouse to Davis F. Davis of Elkton, Virginia.

Meyer's mother is Mary Kinney Meyer (1933–1994), a graduate of St. Mary's Hospital nursing program and the granddaughter of the honorable John Franklin Kinney of Rochester, New York, jurist and corporation counsel to the City of Rochester. Through his maternal line and the Kennys of Coolkenno, He is cousin to Jack Kenny, the American writer, director, actor, and producer.

Meyer's father, Captain James Meyer, USN (Ret.), was born Dec. 2, 1929 in Rochester, New York. He took his master's degree from George Washington University in 1972 through the Naval War College at Newport, Rhode Island.  His thesis was on the transition of the People's Republic of China from a communist to an oligarchical system of government.   He was married to Mary Kinney Meyer  from 1955 to 1994.  There are four Meyer children: Elizabeth, Paul, Maureen and Daniel. Through his paternal line from Neustadt in Silesia (now Prudnik), Meyer is cousin to author David Schickler. His namesake, Dan Fletcher, is a musician and author of the CD Brooklyn Romantical.

Meyer's father, Captain Meyer, entered the United States Navy in 1947 as an enlisted man. The future Captain Meyer served as a radioman after completing the basic course at the Great Lakes Naval Training Center. Attending the electronics school, he was assigned to the Destroyer fleet. In 1949, he was sent to the United States Naval Academy Preparatory School in anticipation of matriculation at the United States Naval Academy in the fall of 1950. Taking his commission from the USNA in 1954, he served briefly  in Flying boats at Willoughby Spit and on board the USS Arneb (AKA-56) before entering the Submarine school at Groton, Connecticut. In his naval service, Captain Meyer conducted the surveillance of the first Soviet fleet operations into the south Atlantic and was the weapons officer of the  during the Cuban Missile Crisis. He was commanding officer of the Requin and Cutlass.

On NATO staff, Captain Meyer served with Admirals John Fieldhouse, James Eberle and Henry Leach. The president of the Mess at their headquarters, HMS Warrior, was Lord Louis Mountbatten. The Frasers of Three Rivers were neighbors and family friends of Captain Meyer and his family.  Captain Meyer's father, George Earl Meyer served on the Texas border in the aftermath of the Mexican revolution during General John J. Pershing's expedition into Mexico.

In 1969 he left sea duty and served on NATO staff in Norfolk, Virginia prior to a Pentagon assignment in Naval Operations (OPNAV) (OP-02) under Admiral Bob Long.  Promoted to captain, he then served as Assistant Chief of Staff, Operations and Intelligence, to the Commander-in-Chief, Eastern Atlantic (CINCEASTLANT) /Commander-in-Chief, Channel (CINCHAN).    His final tour was under Commander, Naval Education & Training (CNET) as commanding officer and professor of naval science at Cornell University (1979–1984) during the presidency of Frank H.T. Rhodes. He was Meyer's commanding officer during then-Midshipman 4/C Meyer's freshman year at Cornell.  Dan Meyer was mentored by Cornell's Richard M. Ramin, in part, due to the latter's relationship with Captain Meyer.  Both Ramin and Dan Meyer were tapped into Cornell's Sphinx Head Society and worked successfully to end that organization's ban on women members.

Selected publications
 Dan Meyer & Everett E. Volk, "W" for War and Wedge? Environmental Enforcement and the Sacrifice of American Security - National and Environmental - To Complete the Emergence of a New "Beltway" Governing Elite, 25 W. New Engl. L. Rev. 41, 104-105 (2003).
 William J. Sill, Communications Assistance for Law Enforcement Agencies Act of 1994 (CALEA), Wireless Review (January, 1999)(Ghost-written).
 Andrew C. Barrett, Deregulating the Second Republic, 47 F.C.L.J. 44 (1994) (co-authorship footnoted).
 Andrew C. Barrett, Shifting Foundations: The Regulation of Telecommunications in an Era of Change, 46 F.C.L.J. 39 (1993)(contribution footnoted) .

Associations
Mr. Meyer is a member of the Phi Kappa Psi Fraternity, Cornell's Sphinx Head Society, and the Irving Literary Society.

References

External links

 U.S. Department of Defense, Office of the Inspector General (AI-CRI)

1965 births
Cornell University alumni
United States Navy officers
People from Ithaca, New York
People from Burkittsville, Maryland 
Living people
Ithaca High School (Ithaca, New York) alumni